Sher Akbar Khan (born 1 April 1957) is a Pakistani politician who had been a member of the National Assembly of Pakistan from August 2018 till January 2023. Previously he was a member of the National Assembly from 2002 to 2007 and again from June 2013 to May 2018.

Early life
He was born on 1 April 1957.

Political career

Khan was elected to the National Assembly of Pakistan as a candidate of Pakistan Peoples Party (Sherpao) (PPP–S) from Constituency NA-28 (Buner) in 2002 Pakistani general election. He received 34,224 votes and defeated Abdul Mateen Khan, a candidate of Awami National Party (ANP).

Khan ran for the seat of the National Assembly as a candidate of PPP–S from Constituency NA-28 (Buner) in 2008 Pakistani general election but was unsuccessful. He received 17,241 votes and lost the seat to Abdul Mateen Khan, a candidate of ANP.

Khan was re-elected to the National Assembly as a candidate of Jamaat-e-Islami Pakistan (JI) from Constituency NA-28 (Buner) in 2013 Pakistani general election. He received 29,170 votes and defeated a candidate of Pakistan Tehreek-e-Insaf (PTI).

In October 2017, he quit JI and joined PTI.

He was re-elected to the National Assembly as a candidate of PTI from Constituency NA-9 (Buner) in 2018 Pakistani general election. He received 58,037 votes and defeated Kamran Khan, a candidate of Pakistan Muslim League (N) (PML-N).

References

Living people
Pashtun people
Pakistani MNAs 2013–2018
1957 births
People from Buner District
Jamaat-e-Islami Pakistan politicians
Pakistani MNAs 2002–2007
Pakistani MNAs 2018–2023